Tshwane District Hospital is situated in Prinshof 349-Jr, a suburb of Pretoria, South Africa. It was known as H. F. Verwoerd Hospital (the current Steve Biko Hospital) until 1994, but is now a separate community hospital that deals with non-critical care.

See also
 Tshwane District

Notes

External links
 Tshwane District Hospital Official website

Hospital buildings completed in 1932
Hospitals in Gauteng
Hospitals with year of establishment missing
Buildings and structures in Pretoria
20th-century architecture in South Africa